ISIDORE is an online platform that allows research and access to human and social sciences digital data. It's a research assistant for humanists.

Creation

ISIDORE was created in 2009 by the CNRS, using its "Adonis large equipment" facilities, with participation from french companies Antidot, Sword and Mondeca. It is now fully integrated to the Huma-Num research infrastructure for humanities and social sciences.

Usage
ISIDORE harvests metadata and fulltext documents indexes them as digital data by enriching them with scientific terms and references (like thesaurus, taxonomies, etc.) in 3 languages: French, English and Spanish. It is edited as a web portal, isidore.science, an API and a SPARQL endpoint that allows access to enriched data in RDF. ISIDORE is available also like a WP plugin, called ISIDORE Suggestions.

ISIDORE is one of the digital platforms engaged in the sharing of scientific open data and promote FAIR Data.

It currently contains over 7M documents, from more 7000 different collections and sources (digital libraries, journals, academic blogs, open archives, scientific databases, archives, etc.), making it the largest open digital library for humanities and social sciences research.

Sources

ISIDORE associates a large panel of scientific platforms and 'data producers':
electronic edition platforms (Cairn.info, Persée, Revues.org, Erudit, etc.),
digital libraries: (Gallica of the BnF, Mazarinum of the bibliothèque Mazarine, bibliothèque Sainte-Geneviève, bibliothèque inter-universitaire de médecine, etc.)
open archives (HAL-SHS (Hyper Article en Ligne - Sciences de l'Homme et de la Société), theses.fr, Thèses en Ligne TEL, etc.) as well as a large number of other scientific databases maintained by French and foreign laboratories.

References 

French digital libraries